For the military history of the airport, see Henderson Field (Guadalcanal)
Honiara International Airport , formerly known as Henderson Field, is an airport in the province of Guadalcanal in the nation of Solomon Islands. It is the primary international airport in the country, the second being Munda Airport in Western Province, which serves as its alternate.

History

The airstrip was under construction by engineers of the Imperial Japanese Navy when it was captured by the American 1st Marine Division. The Marines renamed the nascent field for Marine Major Lofton Henderson, the first Marine aviator killed in action at the Battle of Midway. Henderson, commanding officer of VMSB-241, had died while leading his squadron in an attack against Japanese carrier forces.

Finishing and repairing the field became the main project of the Seabees of Naval Construction Battalion 6. Control of the airstrip was the focus of months of fighting in the Battle for Henderson Field during the Guadalcanal campaign of World War II and the Seabees ensured that the airstrip remained operational throughout the battle.

The field was abandoned after the war, but reopened in 1969 as an international civilian airport. The airport routinely accommodates the Airbus A320.

A magnitude 7.0 earthquake struck 57 km southwest of Honiara on November 22, 2022.

Airlines and destinations

Passenger

References

Airports in the Solomon Islands
Buildings and structures in Honiara